The Label: The Story of Columbia Records is a 2007 book by Gary Marmorstein, about the rise of Columbia Records. It covers how it made its way from the beginning: from signing its own artists, to making them celebrities.

Quotes from the book 
In 1982, CBS Records (through Epic) manufactured Michael Jackson's Thriller, the biggest-selling album ever.

In 1988 CBS Records, including the Columbia Records unit, was acquired by Sony, who re-christened the parent division Sony Music Entertainment in 1991. As Sony only had a temporary license on the CBS Records name, it then acquired the rights to the Columbia trademarks outside the U.S., Canada and Japan (Columbia Graphophone) from EMI, which generally had not been used by them since the early 1970s. CBS Masterworks Records was renamed Sony Classical Records. In December 2006, CBS Corporation revived the CBS Records name for a new minor label closely linked with its television properties.

In the early 1970s, Columbia began recording in a four-channel process called quadraphonic, using the "SQ" standard which used an electronic encoding process that could be decoded by special amplifiers  and then played through four speakers, with each speaker placed in the corner of a room. Remarkably, RCA Victor countered with another quadraphonic process which required a special cartridge to play the "discrete" recordings for four-channel playback. Both Columbia and RCA's quadraphonic records could be played on conventional stereo equipment. Although the Columbia process required less equipment and was quite effective, many were confused by the competing systems and sales of both Columbia's matrix recordings and RCA's discrete recordings were disappointing. A few other companies also issued some matrix recordings for a few years. Quadraphonic recording was used by both classical artists, including Leonard Bernstein and Pierre Boulez, and popular artists such as Barbra Streisand and Carlos Santana.

Notes

2007 non-fiction books
Columbia Records
Books about pop music
American music industry